Windsor Arena (nicknamed The Barn) is an indoor arena located in Windsor, Ontario. Its capacity is approximately 4,400 with standing room. The arena was the home of the Windsor Spitfires of the Ontario Hockey League from 1975 to 2008, at which time the team's home was moved to the WFCU Centre.

History 

Originally named the Border Cities Arena, it hosted the Detroit Cougars (later renamed the Detroit Red Wings) for the 1926-1927 NHL season, while the Olympia Stadium was under construction. The Border Cities Arena, built in 1925 for the local junior hockey team, was expanded from 6,000 to 9,000 for the Cougars. The arena was later renamed the Windsor Arena.

Having been constructed in 1924, the arena is among the oldest of its type in North America.

In 2006, the WFCU Centre, located in the city's east side off Lauzon Road, was approved by the Windsor city council. The decision to replace the arena is attributed to complaints about Windsor Arena's seating and tiny concourses.

The Spitfires' final game at the Windsor Arena was played on December 4, 2008. Windsor beat the Guelph Storm 2-1, giving the Spitfires a perfect 12-0 record at The Barn for the 2008-09 season.

From 2009 until 2013, the University of Windsor Lancers hockey teams took over as the major tenants of the arena.
Also, the Windsor Minor Hockey Association used this arena for games until 2013.

In February 2014, the arena was used as a site for salt storage. I In April 2014, Catholic Central High School proposed a plan to construct a new school on the site, with the full demolition of Windsor Arena being part of the plan without any emphasis. The City of Windsor approved the plan to build the new Catholic Central High School on this site; however, the plans never came to fruition and the school was constructed elsewhere.

References

External links 

"Famous Canadian Arenas" exhibit at the National Library of Canada's Virtual Museum of Canada exhibit. "Windsor Arena"
 http://blogs.windsorstar.com/2014/04/01/board-recommends-building-25-million-downtown-catholic-central-high-school/
 https://windsorstar.com/news/local-news/catholic-school-board-to-continue-to-push-for-new-catholic-central-at-arena-site

Sports venues in Windsor, Ontario
Boxing venues in Ontario
Ontario Hockey League arenas
Defunct indoor arenas in Canada
Indoor ice hockey venues in Canada
Defunct National Hockey League venues
1924 establishments in Ontario
Sports venues completed in 1924
Detroit Red Wings